Elkie is a given name. Notable people with the name include:

 Elkie Brooks (born 1945), English singer
 Elkie Chong (born 1998), Hong Kong singer and actress

See also
 Elke
 Ellie
 Noam Elkies (born 1966), American mathematician